Oprah Winfrey Network, more commonly shortened to OWN, is a Canadian English language discretionary service channel owned by Corus Entertainment. The channel was launched in September 1, 1999 as Canadian Learning Television (CLT) by Learning and Skills Television of Alberta, Ltd., then held by CHUM Limited.

Based on the American cable network of the same name, OWN was initially the only Canadian channel maintaining a brand licensing deal with Warner Bros. Discovery that was not owned by rival broadcaster Bell Media, and remains the only other branded Canadian network that Warner Bros. Discovery does not have an ownership stake in (the other being Bell's Investigation Discovery). After completing their acquisition of Scripps Networks Interactive in 2018, Discovery inherited the minority ownership stakes in the Canadian versions of DIY Network, Food Network, Cooking Channel and HGTV; all of which are majority-owned by Corus.

History

As Canadian Learning Television
In September 1996, Learning and Skills Television of Alberta Ltd. (LSTA) (controlled by CHUM Limited through a 60% interest in the company) was granted a television broadcasting licence by the Canadian Radio-television and Telecommunications Commission (CRTC) called Canadian Learning Television. The channel was licensed to provide "formal and informal educational programs on a wide range of topics."

The channel launched on September 1, 1999 as Canadian Learning Television, with a mix of educational and informational television programs. CHUM would later gain 100% ownership of the channel when it completed its purchase of the remaining interest in LSTA on February 15, 2005. The company would later be renamed Access Media Group.

In 2003, Canadian Learning Television adopted a new logo and on-air presentation. With this change, the channel began using the brand "CLT" in most media, instead of using its full name, although Canadian Learning Television remained the official name of the channel.

In July 2006, Bell Globemedia (later CTVglobemedia) announced that it would purchase CHUM for an estimated CAD$1.7 billion, included in the sale was CLT. As CTVglobemedia planned to retain CTV and Citytv, CLT was among the channels to be acquired by Rogers Communications along with CHUM's A-Channel stations, CKX-TV in Brandon, Access and SexTV: The Channel) as announced on April 9, 2007, pending CRTC approval (and approval of CTVglobemedia's purchase).

However, on June 8, 2007, the CRTC approved the sale of CHUM on a condition that CTV must sell the Citytv stations instead, the Rogers deal was rendered void. As such, CTVglobemedia retained CLT along with the A-Channel stations, CKX-TV and all of CHUM's specialty channels, and sold the Citytv stations to Rogers Media. The transaction was finalized on June 22, 2007.

In less than a year after taking ownership of Canadian Learning Television, on March 7, 2008, CTVglobemedia announced it would sell the channel to Corus Entertainment for approximately $73 million CAD. The deal was approved by the CRTC on August 22, 2008. The transaction was then finalized on September 1, 2008.

Refocusing as a lifestyle channel
In October 2008, Corus announced it would relaunch CLT as Viva, a female-focused entertainment and lifestyle channel targeting the baby boomer demographic. The rebrand took effect on November 3, 2008.

On September 29, 2010, Corus announced it had finalized an agreement to launch a Canadian version of the Oprah Winfrey Network in Canada in 2011. Although Corus had said the new channel would involve rebranding an existing channel owned by the company, it had not announced which channel it would be, nor did Corus announce a specific launch date. However, in November 2010, Corus announced that Viva would be rebranded as OWN on March 1, 2011, two months after the Discovery Health channel in the United States was relaunched as the Oprah Winfrey Network on January 1. During that time, select OWN programming was broadcast on Viva and on another Corus-owned female-targeted channel, W Network. An HD feed was also launched.

CRTC licence controversy

In December 2012, the Canadian Radio-television and Telecommunications Commission held a hearing investigating OWN's non-compliance with its mandate to air formal education programming – a holdover of its establishment as Canadian Learning Television. Although Corus stated that it was planning changes to the network's programming to comply with the requirements (including the introduction of four new weekly educational programs to its lineup), the CRTC warned that it could revoke the channel's license or require Corus to apply for a new category B license to operate the channel under.

On March 15, 2013, the CRTC further issued a "mandatory order", the last step before license revocation. The order asked for the reduction of programming about "life enhancement," and for more programming addressing the building of job and credit-building skills, along with violations of programming, including airing films, which the network is not allowed to do, and that what did air had only a short professor introduction without any tie-in to the film. The CRTC increased monitoring requirements for the network and asked Corus for a new programming plan to be introduced no later than April 5.

In October 2015, the requirement to air adult education programming, as well as the increased monitoring requirements, were both dropped by the CRTC at the request of Corus, as the CRTC is currently in the process of discontinuing the genre protection rules as part of reforms to policies regarding specialty television services.

The channel became a sister station to Food Network, HGTV, and Slice on April 1, 2016, as part of the Corus purchase of Shaw Media.

Programming
When the channel was launched as CLT, it aired a mix of formal and informal educational and informational programming in the style of newsmagazines, talk shows, documentaries, and more. Over time, the channel introduced more entertainment-based programs such as films and television dramas. The channel maintained a similar scheduling format as Access (now CTV Two Alberta), a television service in Alberta which aired a mix of entertainment and educational programming, both of which were under the same ownership of CHUM and later CTVglobemedia before CLT was sold to Corus Entertainment.

As Viva, the channel aired a mix of entertainment and loosely based educational programming to satisfy its CRTC licence requirements, and to that end, many programs continued to be tied to some sort of ongoing course at a Canadian post-secondary institution as it did under CLT. However, with the changeover to Viva, most of the programs had begun with a short introduction from an instructor at the applicable institution.

Under the OWN moniker, the channel continues to target female audiences with programming ranging from lifestyle and information to entertainment programming.

References

External links
 

Television channels and stations established in 1999
Corus Entertainment networks
Analog cable television networks in Canada
Oprah Winfrey
Women's interest channels
English-language television stations in Canada
1999 establishments in Canada